Pacajus Esporte Clube, is a Brazilian professional football club based in Pacajus, Ceará. It competes in the Série D, the fourth tier of Brazilian football, as well as in the Campeonato Cearense, the top flight of the Ceará state football league.

History
Founded on 17 June 2017, Pacajus affiliated themselves in the Federação Cearense de Futebol shortly after and played in the Campeonato Cearense Terceira Divisão later in the year. The club reached the semifinals and won promotion to the Segunda Divisão. After finishing fifth in the 2018 second level, the club won promotion to the Campeonato Cearense in 2019 after reaching the finals but losing the title to Caucaia.

In the 2020 Campeonato Cearense, Pacajus narrowly avoided relegation by finishing seventh. In the 2021 edition, the club finished fifth and qualified to the 2022 Série D.

References

External links
  
 Federação Cearense de Futebol profile 

Football clubs in Ceará
Association football clubs established in 2017
2017 establishments in Brazil